Au Ho-nien is a Chinese painter. He is part of the Lingnan School of painting. In 2019, a solo exhibition of his work was displayed at the Asian Art Museum (San Francisco). He was born in 1935. He was a student of painter Chao Shao-an.

References 

Chinese painters